Štimac is a Serbo-Croatian surname.

It is one of the most common surnames in the Primorje-Gorski Kotar County of Croatia.

Notable people with the name include:

 Andrej Štimac (born 1979), Croatian basketball player
 Craig Stimac (1954–2009), American Major League Baseball catcher
 Greg Stimac (born 1976), American artist
 Ida Štimac (born 2000), Croatian alpine skier
 Igor Štimac (born 1967), retired Croatian footballer
 Jonny Stimac, American vocalist and guitarist of the band Goodbye Elliott
 Vladimir Štimac (born 1987), Serbian basketballer
 Slavko Štimac (born 1960), Yugoslav and Serbian actor

References

Serbian surnames
Croatian surnames
Slavic-language surnames